The following is a list of national American television networks and announcers that have broadcast Preakness Stakes.

Television

2020s

2010s

2000s

1990s

Notes
Jim McKay missed the 1995 Preakness Stakes due to heart surgery.

1980s

1970s

In 1977, ABC was awarded the contract to televise the Preakness. Triple Crown Productions was formed in 1985 after CBS terminated its contract with NYRA. ABC Sports won the rights to broadcast all three races, as well as many prep races. Ratings went up after the package was centralized.

1960s

1950s

1940s

References

Preakness Stakes broadcasters
Preakness Stakes broadcasters
Preakness Stakes broadcasters
Preakness Stakes broadcasters
Preakness Stakes broadcasters
American horse racing announcers
Wide World of Sports (American TV series)
Broadcasters
CBS Sports Spectacular